Haydée Mercedes Sosa (9 July 1935 – 4 October 2009), sometimes known as La Negra (an affectionate nickname for people with a darker complexion in Argentina), was an Argentine singer who was popular throughout Latin America and many countries outside the region. With her roots in Argentine folk music, Sosa became one of the preeminent exponents of El nuevo cancionero. She gave voice to songs written by many Latin American songwriters. Her music made people hail her as the "voice of the voiceless ones".

Sosa performed in venues such as the Lincoln Center in New York City, the Théâtre Mogador in Paris and the Sistine Chapel in Vatican City, as well as sell-out shows in New York's Carnegie Hall and the Roman Colosseum during her final decade of life. Her career spanned four decades and she was the recipient of six Latin Grammy awards (2000, 2003, 2004, 2006, 2009, 2011), including a Latin Grammy Lifetime Achievement Award in 2004 and two posthumous Latin Grammy Award for Best Folk Album in 2009 and 2011. She won the Premio Gardel in 2000, the main musical award in Argentina. She served as an ambassador for UNICEF.

Life
Sosa was born on 9 July 1935, in San Miguel de Tucumán, in the northwestern Argentine province of Tucumán, of mestizo ancestry. She was of French, Spanish and Diaguita descent. Her parents were Peronists, although they never registered in the party, and she started her career as a singer for the Peronist Party in Provincia Tucuman under the name Gladys Osorio. In 1950, at age fifteen, she won a singing competition organized by a local radio station and was given a contract to perform for two months. She recorded her first album, La Voz de la Zafra, in 1959. A performance at the 1965 Cosquín National Folklore Festival—where she was introduced and brought to the stage while sitting in the audience by fellow folk singer Jorge Cafrune— brought her to the attention of the Argentine public.

Sosa and her first husband, Manuel Oscar Matus, with whom she had one son, were key players in the mid-60s nueva canción movement (which was called nuevo cancionero in Argentina). Her second record was Canciones con Fundamento, a collection of Argentine folk songs.

In 1967, Sosa toured the United States and Europe with great success. In later years, she performed and recorded extensively, broadening her repertoire to include material from throughout Latin America.

In the early 1970s, Sosa released two concept albums in collaboration with composer Ariel Ramírez and lyricist Félix Luna: Cantata Sudamericana and Mujeres Argentinas (Argentine Women). She also recorded a tribute to Chilean musician Violeta Parra in 1971, including what was to become one of Sosa's signature songs, Gracias a la Vida. She also increased the popularity of songs written by Milton Nascimento of Brazil and Pablo Milanés and Silvio Rodríguez both from Cuba.

After the military junta of Jorge Videla came to power in 1976, the atmosphere in Argentina grew increasingly oppressive. Sosa faced death threats against both her and her family, but refused for many years to leave the country. At a concert in La Plata in 1979, Sosa was searched and arrested on stage, along with all those attending the concert. Their release came about through international intervention. Banned in her own country, she moved to Paris and then to Madrid.

Sosa returned to Argentina from her exile in Europe in 1982, several months before the military regime collapsed as a result of the Falklands War, and gave a series of concerts at the Teatro Ópera in Buenos Aires, where she invited many of her younger colleagues to share the stage. A double album of recordings from these performances became an instant best seller. In subsequent years, Sosa continued to tour both in Argentina and abroad, performing in such venues as the Lincoln Center in New York City and the Théâtre Mogador in Paris. By then, she was already called America's voice. In poor health for much of the 1990s, she performed a comeback show in Argentina in 1998. In 1994, she played the Sistine Chapel in Vatican City. In 2002, she sold out both Carnegie Hall in New York and the Colosseum in Rome in the same year.

A supporter of Perón, she favored leftist causes throughout her life. She opposed President Carlos Menem, who was in office from 1989 to 1999, and supported the election of Néstor Kirchner, who became president in 2003.
Sosa was a UNESCO Goodwill Ambassador for Latin America and the Caribbean.

In a career spanning four decades, she worked with performers across several genres and generations, folk, opera, pop, rock, including Martha Argerich, Andrea Bocelli, David Broza, Franco Battiato, Jaime Roos, Joan Baez, Francis Cabrel, Gal Costa, Luz Casal, Lila Downs, Lucio Dalla, Maria Farantouri, Lucecita Benitez, Nilda Fernández, Charly Garcia, León Gieco, Gian Marco, Nana Mouskouri, Pablo Milanés, Holly Near, Milton Nascimento, Pata Negra, Fito Páez, Franco De Vita, Lourdes Pérez, Luciano Pavarotti, Silvio Rodríguez, Ismael Serrano, Shakira, Sting, Caetano Veloso, Julieta Venegas, Gustavo Cerati and Konstantin Wecker

Sosa participated in a 1999 production of Ariel Ramírez's Misa Criolla. Her song Balderrama is featured in the 2008 movie Che, starring Benicio del Toro as the Argentine Marxist revolutionary Che Guevara.

Sosa was the former co-chair of the Earth Charter International Commission.

Awards
She won the Latin Grammy Award for Best Folk Album in 2000 (Misa Criolla), 2003 (Acústico), 2006 (Corazón Libre), 2009 (Cantora 1, which also won Best Recording Package and was nominated for Album of the Year), and 2011 (Deja La Vida Volar), as well as several international awards.

In 1995, Konex Foundation from Argentina granted her the Diamond Konex Award, one of the most prestigious awards in Argentina, as the most important personality in the Popular Music of her country in the last decade.

Death

Suffering from recurrent endocrine and respiratory problems in later years, the 74-year-old Sosa was hospitalized in Buenos Aires on 18 September 2009. She died from multiple organ failure on 4 October 2009, at 5:15 am. She is survived by one son, Fabián Matus, born of her first marriage. He said: "She lived her 74 years to the fullest. She had done practically everything she wanted, she didn't have any type of barrier or any type of fear that limited her". The hospital expressed its sympathies to her relatives. Her website featured the following: "Her undisputed talent, her honesty and her profound convictions leave a great legacy to future generations".

Her body was placed on display at the National Congress building in Buenos Aires for the public to pay their respects, and President Fernández de Kirchner ordered three days of national mourning. Thousands had queued by the end of the day. She was cremated on 5 October.

Sosa's obituary in The Daily Telegraph said she was "an unrivalled interpreter of works by her compatriot, the Argentine Atahualpa Yupanqui, and Chile's Violeta Parra". Helen Popper of Reuters reported her death by saying she "fought South America's dictators with her voice and became a giant of contemporary Latin American music". Sosa received three Latin Grammy nominations for her album, in 2009 . She went on to win Best Folk Album about a month after her death.

Tribute
In 2019, she was celebrated by a Google Doodle. The doodle was showcased in Argentina, Chile, Uruguay, Paraguay, Bolivia, Peru, Ecuador, Cuba, Iceland, Sweden, Serbia, Greece, Israel and Vietnam.

In 2023, Rolling Stone ranked Sosa at number 160 on its list of the 200 Greatest Singers of All Time.

Discography

She recorded forty albums.

Studio albums

EPs

Live albums

Compilation albums

Filmography
Güemes, la tierra en armas (1971)
Argentinísima (1972)
Esta es mi Argentina (1974)
Mercedes Sosa, como un pájaro libre (1983)
Será possible el sur: Mercedes Sosa (1985)
Historias de Argentina en vivo (2001)

Biographies 
Mercedes Sosa, La Negra by Rodolfo Braceli (Spanish only)

Mercedes Sosa, La Mami by Fabián Matus (Spanish only)

Mercedes Sosa, The Voice of Hope by Anette Christensen (translated into Spanish and Portuguese)

Mercedes Sosa, More than a Song by Anette Christensen (translated into Spanish, French, Italian, Lithuanian and Portuguese)

References

External links

 Tribute to Mercedes Sosa (in Portuguese BR)
 Mercedes Sosa's website (in Spanish)
 Mercedes Sosa's News (in Spanish)
 

1935 births
2009 deaths
Latin Grammy Award winners
20th-century Argentine women singers
Argentine activists
Argentine women activists
Argentine people of French descent
Argentine people of Diaguita descent
Argentine people of Quechua descent
Deaths from kidney failure
People from San Miguel de Tucumán
Nueva canción musicians
Bombo legüero players
Latin Grammy Lifetime Achievement Award winners
20th-century drummers
Women in Latin music